SoRI-20041 is an "antagonist-like" allosteric modulator of amphetamine-induced dopamine release (in contrast to the related research chemicals SoRI-9804 and SoRI-20040, which are "agonist-like"). SoRI-20041 is believed to be the first example of a drug that separately modulates uptake versus release in the dopamine transporter (possibly showing how inward and outward transport represent distinct operational modes of DAT); it produces the same effects as SoRI-20040 and SoRI-9804 in uptake assays and binding assays, inhibiting the re-uptake of dopamine, but does not modulate d-amphetamine-induced DA release by inhibiting that as well, like 'agonists' of the series do.

This suggests the possibility of simultaneous action and increase of indirect-agonism through the dual action of DRA and DRI efficacy existing together. This increases the inhibition of re-uptake at synaptic dopamine concentrations without interfering in the flow of release of dopamine from amphetaminergic phosphorylation at the affected transporter. This overcomes the obstacle of a compromised binding site that would be rendered unusable through the action of amphetamine. Conventional dopamine re-uptake inhibitors (such as cocaine or methylphenidate) would otherwise ineffectively target such a site on each specific transporter so affected by amphetamine, making this an example of a DRI that does not have a mutually exclusive functionality against DRA action at individual instances of DAT.

References 

Neurochemistry